Huángdūn (黄墩) could refer to the following locations in China:

 Huangdun, Huaining County, town in southwestern Anhui
 Huangdun, Suqian, town in Suyu District, Suqian, Jiangsu
 Huangdun, Rizhao, town in Lanshan District, Rizhao, Shandong